16S rRNA (cytidine1402-2'-O)-methyltransferase (RsmI, YraL) is an enzyme with systematic name S-adenosyl-L-methionine:16S rRNA (cytidine1402-2'-O)-methyltransferase. This enzyme catalyses the following chemical reaction

 S-adenosyl-L-methionine + cytidine1402 in 16S rRNA  S-adenosyl-L-homocysteine + 2'-O-methylcytidine1402 in 16S rRNA

RsmI catalyses the 2'-O-methylation of cytidine1402.

References

External links 

EC 2.1.1